Gökçekonak is a village in the Pülümür District, Tunceli Province, Turkey. The village is populated by Kurds of the Balaban tribe and had a population of 38 in 2021.

The hamlets of Ağıldere, Atlıca, Bahçeli, Beyce, Çanakçı, Çatalbaş, Çatılı, Çay, Çobandamı, Ekincik, Gedikli, Harmancık, Karaağaç, Kayacık, Keçili, Muratlı, Pelitli, Poyracık, Poyraz, Seyit, Seyiler, Şemseddin, Yedikardeş, Yıldızlı and Ziyaret are attached to the village.

References 

Kurdish settlements in Tunceli Province
Villages in Pülümür District